Bluntisham railway station was a station in Bluntisham, Cambridgeshire on the Ely and St Ives Railway. The station closed for regular passenger services in 1931 but was used for special excursion trains until 1958 
The station had a single platform, a signal box, and a goods shed on a loop.

References

External links
 Bluntisham station on navigable 1946 O. S. map
 Bluntisham station on Subterranea Britannica

Disused railway stations in Cambridgeshire
Former Great Eastern Railway stations
Railway stations in Great Britain opened in 1878
Railway stations in Great Britain closed in 1931